Howard Nelson is a Trinidadian ecologist and wildlife biologist. Nelson earned his bachelor's and master's degrees at the University of the West Indies and his doctoral work at the University of Wisconsin–Madison under the guidance of Stanley Temple. For his MPhil degree he conducted an ecological study of the mammalian community of Trinidad, including the first camera trapping study of the ocelot (Leopardus pardalis) on Trinidad and the first survey of game mammals. For his doctoral work Nelson completed a re-classification of the vegetation communities of Trinidad and Tobago, a massive undertaking which updates John Stanley Beard's 1946 classification.

He was the CEO and Conservation Manager at the Asa Wright Nature Centre located in the Arima Valley in Trinidad's Northern Range between 2003 and 2008. He went on to help establish and become the programme lead of a regional masters programme at the University of the West Indies, the MSc Biodiversity Conservation and Sustainable Development in the Caribbean. Since 2014 he has worked at the University of Chester, where he is currently a senior lecturer in conservation.

While working as the Environmental Biologist in the Ministry of the Environment between 2000-2001 and 2008-2009, Nelson played an important role in the drafting of laws to establish a National Parks and Wildlife Authority which, had it been implemented, would have radically altered the responsibility for environmental management in Trinidad and Tobago. Subsequently, as a member of cabinet appointed committees, he co-led the writing of the new National Wildlife, National Forest and National Protected Areas Policies for Trinidad and Tobago.

References
 Nelson, Howard P. 2004. Tropical forest ecosystems of Trinidad: Ecological patterns and public perceptions. PhD Dissertation, University of Wisconsin, Madison
 Nelson, Howard P. 1996. Ecological studies of forest mammals in the West Indies, with a focus on Trinidad. MPhil Thesis, University of the West Indies - St. Augustine, Trinidad                               
 20 July 2005 - Launch of a new public education poster on the Pawi (Pipile pipile) (references Nelson as CEO of Asa Wright)
 Making a Gift to the Asa Wright Nature Centre (references Nelson as CEO and Conservation Manager).
 Fairhead, J. and M. Leach, 2000, Science, policy and national parks in Trinidad and Tobago. Working paper, draft mimeo, IDS pdf (background and context for the drive to develop a national parks system).
 National Forest Policy. Government of the Republic of Trinidad and Tobago (2011) National Forest Policy 44pp.
 National Protected Areas Policy. Government of the Republic of Trinidad and Tobago (2011) National Protected Areas Policy 57pp.
 National Wildlife Policy. Government of the Republic of Trinidad and Tobago (2013) National Wildlife Policy 56pp.

Living people
University of the West Indies alumni
Wildlife biologists
Trinidad and Tobago ecologists
Year of birth missing (living people)